Mowlowy-ye Dust Mohammad (also Romanized as Mowlowy-ye Dūst Moḩammad) is a village in Qorqori Rural District, Qorqori District, Hirmand County, Sistan and Baluchestan Province, Iran. At the 2006 census, its population was 51, in 9 families.

References 

Populated places in Hirmand County